Alan Turner (born October 10, 1984) is a professional American and Canadian football wide receiver who is a free agent. He was signed by the New York Jets as an undrafted free agent in 2008. He played college football for the Southern Illinois Salukis.

Turner has also played for the Chicago Rush and Edmonton Eskimos.

References

1984 births
Living people
People from Normal, Illinois
American players of Canadian football
Canadian football wide receivers
American football wide receivers
Southern Illinois Salukis football players
New York Jets players
Edmonton Elks players
Chicago Rush players
Philadelphia Soul players